Conditional clauses in Ancient Greek are clauses which start with  "if" or  "if (it may be)".  can be contracted to  or , with a long vowel. The "if"-clause of a conditional sentence is called the protasis, and the consequent or main clause is called the apodosis.

The negative particle in a conditional clause is usually , making the conjunctions  or  "unless", "if not". However, some conditions have . The apodosis usually has .

The conjunction  "if" also frequently introduces an indirect question.

Classification of conditional clauses
Conditional clauses are classified into a small number of different types, as shown on the table below. 

Grammatically, there is no difference between a present general condition ("if ever it happens") and a vivid future ("if it happens"), both having  with the subjunctive. Similarly there is no difference between a past general condition ("if ever it happened") and a less vivid future condition ("if it were to happen"), both having  with the optative. In this case, only the apodosis will distinguish which type of clause it is.

Those conditions which imagine a purely hypothetical situation (for example, "if I were to die", "if I was dead", "if I had died") usually have the particle  in the apodosis. However,  can sometimes be omitted, for example if the apodosis has an imperfect tense verb such as  "it was necessary" or  "it was possible".

Simple (open) conditions
A simple condition uses the indicative in the protasis. The apodosis can have an imperative:
 (Xenophon)

"if anyone sees anything better, let him say so."

 (Xenophon)

"if you want to, stay with the army."

 (Xenophon)

"if you want, it is possible for you to take us as allies."

A simple conditional may use any tense of the indicative. The following has the perfect indicative:
 (Andocides)

"if I have committed any sacrilege, put me to death."

The following uses the imperfect indicative in both clauses:
 (Lysias)

"if on that night I was plotting against Eratosthenes, was it better for me to dine elsewhere or to bring that guest to my house?"

The following uses the aorist indicative followed by an aorist imperative:
 (Andocides)

"if you heard anything about this matter which has happened, tell us."

The following, from Euripides' play Electra, has two aorist indicative tenses:
 (Euripides)

"even if, as you say, our father killed your daughter,how did I or my brother wrong you?"

Future conditions

"Emotional" future conditions
In an open conditional the tense of the protasis can be future indicative. According to Smyth, this kind of vivid future conditional is used when the protasis expresses strong feeling: "the apodosis commonly conveys a threat, a warning, or an earnest appeal to the feelings". He refers to it as the "emotional future" conditional.

In the following, a present tense apodosis is combined with a future protasis:
 (Xenophon)

'it's impossible to go past, unless we first cut down these men.'

 (Xenophon)

"there is no food for the army, unless we capture the fort."

In the following poetic example, the protasis has a future indicative as before, but in the apodosis instead of a future, there is an aorist indicative:
 (Euripides)

"I am undone if you leave me, wife!"

Vivid future conditions

Conditional sentences of this kind are referred to by Smyth as the "more vivid" future conditions, and are very common. In the following examples, the protasis has the present subjunctive, and the apodosis has the future indicative:

  (Plato)
 
 "I will come to see you tomorrow, if God is willing."

 . (Xenophon)
 .
 "if it's necessary, we shall make war."

 (Plato)

"if you seek well, you will find."

 (Aristotle)

'for if you say just things, people will hate you; if you say unjust things, the gods will.'

The apodosis can contain a present tense, if the verb is  "it is necessary":
 (Aristophanes)

"you two must suffer the same penalty too, if you are defeated"

The negative used in a conditional clause is usually :
 . (Thucydides)
 .
 "if they are not willing, they will force them."

 (Plato)

"if you don't agree, I will produce witnesses."

However, sometimes the negative  is used, for example, when  has the force of a single word "deny":

 (Plato)

"whether you and Anytos deny it or agree with it"

In the following example, the aorist subjunctive is used in the protasis, to indicate that the action of capturing the hill must be done first before the enemy can be dislodged:
 (Xenophon)

"if we can first capture that (hill), the men threatening the road will not be able to remain."

Less vivid future conditions
The "less vivid" future (or "ideal") conditional describes a hypothetical situation in the future. There is often an implication that the speaker does not expect the situation to actually happen. The optative mood is used in both halves of the sentence, with the particle  added before or after the verb in the apodosis.

The tense of the verb can be aorist (if it is an event) or present (if it describes a situation). The following three examples use the aorist optative:

 (Xenophon)

"the Parthenios river also cannot be crossed, to which you would come if you crossed the Halys."

 (Plato)
.
"there would be nothing strange about it if I were to die."

 (Aeschines)

"if one of you were to ask me ... I would say ..."

The following have present optative in the protasis, aorist optative in the apodosis:
 (Plato)

"if you knew how much money I have earned, you would be amazed."

 (Xenophon)

"I would gladly accept it, if he were offering it."

The following uses the present optative in the apodosis:

.
"I wouldn't be surprised (if that were so)." 

In post-classical Greek, the optative mood gradually fell out of use. In the New Testament the potential optative with  occurs, but rarely (e.g. Acts 8:31);  with the optative also sometimes occurs (e.g. 2 Peter 3:14).

General conditions

Present general conditions
A present general condition uses the same grammatical construction ( with the subjunctive) as a vivid future condition, but is much less common. The present subjunctive is used when the actions of the two clauses are contemporaneous:
 (Menander)

"the foolish person laughs, even if there is nothing funny."

The following has the aorist subjunctive, indicating that the first action precedes the second:
 (Euripides)

"if ever death draws near, no one wishes to die."

The perfect subjunctive also refers to a situation existing at the time of the main verb, but as a result of something which happened earlier, as in the example below:
. (Xenophon)
.
"whether (the hare) has been caught or not, (the huntsman) should make it clear (to his colleagues)."

Occasionally, the verb in the apodosis is an aorist tense, but with the sense of a present. This is known as a "gnomic aorist":
. (Xenophon)
.
"if a man transgress anyone one of these laws, they always impose a penalty on him."

Past general conditions
The optative mood can similarly be used after  "if" in general clauses of the type "if ever it used to happen". In the following examples the present optative is used in the protasis, and the imperfect indicative in the apodosis:
  (Xenophon)
 
 "If ever he saw something edible anywhere, he would pass it round."

 (Xenophon)

"and (the barley-wine) was completely undiluted, unless someone added water."

In the following, however, the aorist optative is used in the protasis, to indicate that the action of sharing had to come before that of being allowed near the fire:
  (Xenophon)
 .
 "they wouldn't let the late-comers come near the fire, unless they first shared some wheat with them."

In the following example, as often happens, the protasis is reduced simply to  "otherwise". Here  stands for "but if they didn't hold their weapons above the water":
 (Xenophon)

"and it was not possible to hold their weapons in the water, otherwise the river kept snatching them away."

Sometimes in the apodosis of a past general condition, the particle   is added to an imperfect or aorist indicative tense to express repeated past action. This is called the "iterative imperfect or aorist". The following example has the imperfect indicative with  :

 (Xenophon)

"if ever anyone opposed him on anything ... he would bring the whole subject back to the beginning"

The following uses the aorist indicative with  :
. (Xenophon)
.
'if ever anyone seemed to him to be lagging behind, he would pick out the culprit and would beat him.'

Unreal conditions

Present unreal conditions
Unreal (counterfactual) conditions referring to present time are made with  followed by the imperfect indicative in the protasis, and the imperfect indicative combined with  the particle  in the apodosis:

 (Xenophon)

"they wouldn't be able to do this if they weren't following a temperate diet."

 (Andocides)

"if these things were true, you would be getting angry with me"

Past unreal conditions
In unreal (counterfactual) past conditions, the aorist indicative is used in both the protasis and the apodosis. To give the meaning "would", the particle  is added in the apodosis only:
 (Xenophon)

"he would not have done this, if I had not ordered him."

The following example has an apodosis only with no protasis. The tense is aorist indicative:
 (Demosthenes)

"for who would have expected these things to happen?"

An imperfect tense in an unreal condition can refer to the past as well as the present, as in the following, where the verb  is imperfect indicative.
. (Xenophon)
.
"if I had understood before, I would not have followed you."

In the following, the first imperfect refers to the past, the second to the present time:

 (Philemon)

"if I had not been toiling then, I would not now be rejoicing."

The particle  is occasionally omitted from an unreal condition, especially if the apodosis contains an imperfect tense verb of obligation or possibility, such as  "it was possible":

 (Aeschines) 

"it would have been possible for him, if he had been wise, not to accuse me falsely."

However, in other examples, where the emphasis is on the possibility or the necessity rather than the dependent infinitive,  is added. In the following example,  is the aorist tense corresponding to the imperfect :
 (Lysias)

"if (the tortured slaves) were to say about me what he wanted them to say, it wouldn't have been possible for me to defend myself." 

Some other expressions also lack , for example:

 (Lysias)

"if (the tortured slaves) did not agree with him, he wouldn't have been liable to any penalty."

If by chance
A vivid future conditional clause using  with the subjunctive can be used with the meaning "in the hope that", "in case by chance", or "to see if perhaps", "on the off chance that".
 (Plato)

"listen to me too, in case the same things may still seem true to you."

In a historic context, this type of clause becomes a less vivid future, using  or  "if by chance" with the optative mood. In the first example below,  "they might persuade" is aorist optative:

 (Thucydides)

"proceeding to Asia to the King, in the hope that they might persuade him to provide money and join the war."

  (Acts)
 
 "for he was hurrying, in case it might be possible for him to reach Jerusalem by the day of Pentecost."

Wishes
Wishes in Greek use tenses from the historic sequence: optative, imperfect indicative, and aorist indicative, depending on whether they refer  to the future, present or past.

Wishes for the future
The optative mood alone can be used to express wishes for the future:
  (Demosthenes)
 
 "which may it not happen!"

In this case it has the same construction as a less vivid future condition:
  (Xenophon)
 
 "if only it might happen!"

Wishes for the present and past
The imperfect indicative is used for present time:
  (Euripides)
 
 "if only, mother, you had a better heart!"

The aorist indicative is used for an unattainable wish referring to past time:
  (Xenophon)
 
 "if only I had been with you then, Pericles!"

Sometimes the aorist tense of the verb  "I owe" is added:
 (Aristophanes)

"did you get the three-obol fee?" – "I wish I had!"

Hence in the well-known opening of Euripides' play Medea:
 (Euripides)

"if only the ship Argo had not flown throughthe dark blue Clashing Rocks to the land of the Colchians!"

Conditional relative clauses
A common idiom in Ancient Greek is for the protasis of a conditional clause to be replaced by a relative clause. (For example, "whoever saw it would be amazed" = "if anyone saw it, they would be amazed.") Such sentences are known as "conditional relative clauses", and they follow the same grammar as ordinary conditionals. Such relative clauses are always indefinite, for example:

 (Xenophon)

"whoever wishes to survive, let him try to conquer."

 (Lysias)

"your children, as many as were here (i.e. if any had been here), would have been abused by these men."

Conditional clauses in indirect speech

Indirect statements
In some circumstances a verb is changed to a participle, and sometimes a present indicative becomes imperfect tense.

In indirect conditional clauses, in a historic context, ἐάν + subjunctive may optionally be changed to εἰ + optative. However, an imperfect or aorist indicative in the protasis of an unreal conditional sentence is not changed to the optative. In the apodosis of an ideal or unreal conditional,  is retained when the verb is changed to an infinitive or participle.

The following table shows how the tenses of an original statement are changed to different tenses of the infinitive, participle, and optative when the speech is made indirect:

{| class="wikitable"
! Original speech
! Infinitive
! Participle
! Optative
! Past
|-
| Present or imperfect
| Present
| Present
| Present
| Imperfect
|-
| Future indicative
| Future
| Future
| Future
|
|-
| Aorist indicative
| Aorist
| Aorist
| Aorist
|
|-
| Perfect or pluperfect
| Perfect
| Perfect
| Perfect
| Pluperfect
|}

Indirect statements with the infinitive
In the four examples of indirect statement below, all the main verbs of the original speech have been changed to an infinitive. 

The first example is an indirect present tense open conditional. The present infinitive  represents a present indicative (  "you are freeing") in the original speech. The present indicative verb of the protasis ("you are killing") is changed to the imperfect indicative, as if the writer were stating a fact rather than quoting a speech:

 (Thucydides)

"they said that he was not freeing Greece in a good way, if he was killing men."

The following example is an indirect emotional future conditional. The two main verbs ("there is" and "it will be") have been changed to the present and future infinitive respectively. The future indicative in the protasis ("will capture in advance") has been changed into the future optative mood:

 (Xenophon)

"he said that there was a hill-top which, unless someone captured it first, it was going to be impossible to get past."

The following is an unreal past conditional. The verb in the protasis, which would have been an imperfect indicative in the original speech, has been changed to a present participle using the genitive absolute construction. The aorist tense main verb has been changed into the aorist infinitive; the particle  is retained, but has been placed after the participle:

 (Demosthenes)

"do you think that, if someone had told them, they would have believed it?"

The following is a vivid future conditional in a historic context. The main verb "I will not stop" is changed into the future infinitive. The verb in the relative clause (  "I am campaigning") is changed from present to imperfect indicative: 

 (Xenophon)

"promising them that if he accomplished what he was campaigning for, he would not stop until he brought them back home."

Indirect statements with 
Indirect statements can also be made in Greek using the conjunction  "that". If the context is past, the verbs may optionally be changed to the optative mood. 

In the following example, the main verb  has been changed to the future optative, but the future indicative in the protasis has not been changed to the optative:
 (Xenophon)

"they threatened him that if they caught (lit. will catch) him running away, they would punish him."

However, in unreal conditional clauses, the indicative always remains and there is no change to the optative:
 (Xenophon)

"they pleaded that they would never have been so foolish if they had known."

Indirect questions
An indirect question is often introduced by  "if", even though the original question does not contain a conditional clause. In a historic context, the main verb may be changed to the optative mood, as in the first example below. In this example, the 2nd person present indicative  "are you willing?" has been changed to the 3rd person present optative. The aorist participle  "having received" possibly stands for a vivid future ("if you receive") or less vivid future protasis ("if you were to receive"):

 (Lysias)

"I asked Pison if he was willing to save me if he received some money."

An optative mood does not change in indirect speech.

 (Xenophon)

"they asked if (the Greeks) would give pledges concerning these matters."

Indirect commands
In indirect commands also, the verb is generally changed to an infinitive, as in the following example:

 (Thucydides)

"(the letter said that) if therefore they wished to say something clearly, they should send some men to him."

In the above sentence, although the context is historic, the writer has chosen not to use the optative but the more vivid indicative mood with the verb  "they wish". This retention of the vivid mood is typical of Thucydides's style.

Conditional clauses in Homer
There are some differences between Homeric conditionals and those in classical Greek. As well as  "if", Homer also uses the Aeolic dialect form .

In the following, the protasis has the aorist subjunctive, while the apodosis has the future indicative:

 (Iliad)

"for if he kills you, I will not weep for you."

In the following, both verbs are aorist subjunctive:

 (Iliad)

"but if he does not give her up, I will seize her myself."

In the following example, the verb  is aorist subjunctive, while  "he keeps" is present indicative:

 (Iliad)

"for even if he swallows down his anger on that day, yet later he keeps a grudge, until he fulfils it."

In the less vivid future conditional,  or  can be added after , with no difference in meaning. In the following, both verbs are aorist optative:

 (Iliad)

"for I could not suffer anything worse, not even if I found out that my father had died"

In Homer, the imperfect in unreal conditionals refers only to past time. In a present unreal conditional, the protasis may have the optative in both halves, although this is very rare.

 (Iliad)

"and at this point Aeneas might have perished, if Aphrodite had not quickly observed him"

See also
 Latin conditional clauses
 Conditional sentence
 Counterfactual conditional

References

Ancient Greek
Greek grammar
Natural language conditionals